"New York Minute" is a song written by Don Henley, Danny Kortchmar, and Jai Winding. Henley originally recorded it for his 1989 album The End of the Innocence. The track features Pino Palladino on fretless bass, Toto members David Paich, who played piano and wrote the string arrangement, and Jeff Porcaro on drums. It also features Take 6 on background vocals.

Reception
The single was a #5 hit on the U.S. Adult Contemporary chart the following year, although it reached only #48 on the Billboard Hot 100.

Eagles performances
"New York Minute" is one of several of Henley's solo songs to be performed by the Eagles (the others being "Dirty Laundry", "All She Wants to Do Is Dance", "The Boys of Summer", "The Heart of the Matter", and "Sunset Grill") during  the Hell Freezes Over tour.

Personnel 
 Don Henley – lead vocals
 Danny Kortchmar – keyboards, guitars
 Jai Winding – keyboards
 David Paich – acoustic piano, string arrangements
 Pino Palladino – bass guitar
 Jeff Porcaro – drums
 Steve Madaio – trumpet solo
 Take 6 – backing vocals

Other appearances
It is featured in The West Wing episode "Somebody's Going to Emergency, Somebody's Going to Jail," which was named for a line from the song. It is also featured in the Friends episode "The One with Two Parts, Part Two" and at the final of the first episode (365) of Black Monday.

Charts

Weekly charts

Year-end charts

References

1989 songs
Don Henley songs
Songs about New York City
Songs written by Danny Kortchmar
Songs written by Don Henley
Songs about suicide
Rock ballads
1980s ballads
Song recordings produced by Danny Kortchmar